Aquimarina agarivorans  is a Gram-negative, facultatively anaerobic and rod-shaped bacterium from the genus of Aquimarina which has been isolated from the red algae Gelidium amansii from the intertidal zone from Weihai in China.

References 

Flavobacteria
Bacteria described in 2015